Ľuboš Perniš (born 21 September 1976 in Bojnice) is a Slovak football striker.

References

External links

1976 births
Living people
Slovak footballers
Association football forwards
FK Dukla Banská Bystrica players
FC Baník Prievidza players
FK Inter Bratislava players
MŠK Púchov players
FC Nitra players
FC Vysočina Jihlava players
1. FC Tatran Prešov players
Sliema Wanderers F.C. players
Slovak Super Liga players
Expatriate footballers in the Czech Republic
Expatriate footballers in Malta
Expatriate footballers in Kuwait
Sportspeople from Bojnice
Al-Arabi SC (Kuwait) players
Kuwait Premier League players
Slovak expatriate sportspeople in Kuwait
Slovak expatriate sportspeople in Malta
Slovak expatriate sportspeople in the Czech Republic
Slovak expatriate footballers